Gapville is an unincorporated community within Magoffin County, Kentucky, United States.

A post office was established in the community in 1888. Gapville was named for a local mountain pass important to early travel through the area.

References

Unincorporated communities in Magoffin County, Kentucky
Unincorporated communities in Kentucky